Washington Township is a township in Lehigh County, Pennsylvania. The population of Washington Township was 6,624 at the 2010 census. It is a suburb of Allentown in the Lehigh Valley, which had a population of 861,899 and was the 68th most populous metropolitan area in the U.S. as of the 2020 census.

History
The Vigilant Fire Company Firemen's Monument was added to the National Register of Historic Places in 2004.

Geography
Washington Township is the northernmost in Lehigh County. It is drained by the Lehigh River, which separates it from Northampton County to the east, and Blue Mountain separates it from Carbon County to the north.

Its villages include Best Station, Emerald, Friedens, Lehigh Furnace, Lehigh Gap (also in Northampton County,) Neffs (also in North Whitehall Township,) Newhard, Newside, and Slatedale.

Adjacent municipalities
North Whitehall Township (south)
Heidelberg Township (west)
East Penn Township, Carbon County (north)
Lower Towamensing Township (tangent to the northeast)
Lehigh Township (east)
Slatington (east)
Walnutport (east)

Climate
The township has a humid continental climate (Dfa/Dfb) and the hardiness zones are 6a and 6b.

Demographics

As of the census of 2000, there were 6,588 people, 2,512 households, and 1,929 families residing in the township.  The population density was 278.4 people per square mile (107.5/km2).  There were 2,594 housing units at an average density of 109.6/sq mi (42.3/km2).  The racial makeup of the township was 98.71% White, 0.21% African American, 0.08% Native American, 0.41% Asian, 0.24% from other races, and 0.35% from two or more races. Hispanic or Latino of any race were 0.97% of the population.

There were 2,512 households, out of which 32.0% had children under the age of 18 living with them, 65.2% were married couples living together, 7.2% had a female householder with no husband present, and 23.2% were non-families. 18.0% of all households were made up of individuals, and 7.8% had someone living alone who was 65 years of age or older.  The average household size was 2.62 and the average family size was 2.97.

In the township, the population was spread out, with 22.7% under the age of 18, 6.9% from 18 to 24, 31.4% from 25 to 44, 27.3% from 45 to 64, and 11.7% who were 65 years of age or older.  The median age was 40 years. For every 100 females, there were 103.0 males.  For every 100 females age 18 and over, there were 101.8 males. The median income for a household in the township was $50,587, and the median income for a family was $55,332. Males had a median income of $35,340 versus $26,967 for females. The per capita income for the township was $19,980.  About 3.5% of families and 5.1% of the population were below the poverty line, including 3.0% of those under age 18 and 10.9% of those age 65 or over.

Education
The township is served by the Northern Lehigh School District. Students in grades nine through 12 attend Northern Lehigh High School in Slatington.

Transportation

Interstate 476 follows the Pennsylvania Turnpike's Northeast Extension along a northwest-southeast alignment through Washington Township, entering the Lehigh Tunnel near the north edge of the township. However, the nearest interchange is in South Whitehall Township. Local access to the township is provided by Pennsylvania Route 873, which crosses north-to-south from Pennsylvania Route 248 in Lehigh Gap to PA Route 329 in Neffs and PA Route 309 in Schnecksville. An important east-to-west thoroughfare is Mountain Road, which proceeds west from PA 873 in Lehigh Gap to PA 309 north of New Tripoli. LANta serves the township with bus route 325.

References

External links

Townships in Lehigh County, Pennsylvania
Townships in Pennsylvania